Sabaila is a village in Saharsa District, Bihar, India. 

Villages in Saharsa district